Turkey has no official national emblem, but the crescent and star design from the national flag is in use as the de facto national emblem on Turkish passports, Turkish identity cards and at the diplomatic missions of Turkey.

The crescent and star are from the 19th-century Ottoman flag (1844–1923) which also forms the basis of the present-day Turkish flag. Following the abolition of the Sultanate on 1 November 1922, the Ottoman coat of arms was no longer used and the crescent and star became Turkey's de facto national emblem. In the national identity cards of the 1930s the horns of the crescent were facing left, instead of the now more common orientation towards right.

History 
The coat of arms of the Sultan was abolished from usage after the abolition of the Ottoman sultanate in 1922. In its stead, the star and crescent on the flag was adopted. Three years later, in 1925, Ministry of Education opened a contest for determining another official coat of arms and artist Namık İsmail's design won. İsmail's design featured a red shield charged with a white star and crescent. Underneath there was a grey wolf, connected to Oghuz Turkic mythology, standing on a spear. The shield was surrounded by a garland of wheat and oak leaves, with a medallion depicting Ottoman alphabet letters T and C for Türkiye Cumhuriyeti, Republic of Turkey. Above the shield was placed a lit torch, symbolising the country's independence. However, the new coat of arms was never registered as an official coat of arms, and was never used subsequently.

Use by government bodies

Red circle with white star and crescent 
A circular section of the red Flag of Turkey containing the white crescent and star is used in the current emblems of a number of Turkish ministries and governmental institutions, in the emblem of the Grand National Assembly, and as the flag badge on the uniforms of Turkish national sports teams and athletes. It was also used on the old (non-digital) Turkish identity cards.

Coat of arms of the Ministry of Foreign Affairs 

The Turkish Ministry of Foreign Affairs often uses a red oval-shaped escutcheon which takes its colour from the Turkish flag, while its shape echoes the oval shield at the center of the late 19th-century Ottoman coat of arms. The escutcheon contains a gold-tone crescent and star which are vertically oriented (with the star on top) and surrounded by the gold-tone text T.C. Dışişleri Bakanlığı. A variant of this oval escutcheon (containing the gold-tone text Türkiye Cumhuriyeti Büyükelçiliği) is used by the Turkish embassies.

Presidential seal 
The seal of the President of Turkey has a large 16-pointed star in the center, which is surrounded by 16 five-pointed stars, symbolizing the 16 Great Turkic Empires. Its appearance is regulated by law.

See also

 Coat of arms of the Ottoman Empire
 Flag of Turkey
 Turkey
 Coats of arms of Europe

References 

Turkey
National symbols of Turkey
Turkey
Turkey
Turkish coats of arms